Asociación Deportiva Santos, commonly known simply as Santos de Guápiles, is a Costa Rican association football club, which currently plays in the UNAFUT Liga Promerica.

The club plays in Estadio Ebal Rodríguez in Guápiles, Limón, Costa Rica.

History
The club was founded in 1961 and have never been league champions. They were runner-up twice, in 2001–02 and in the 2012 Verano championship. They reached the top tier after winning promotion in 1999 after beating Municipal Liberia in a May 1999 play-off final marred by violence off the pitch.

Stadium
Santos play their home games in the Estadio Ebal Rodríguez, where Alajuelense's Wilson Muñoz scored the first Primera División goal in a 1999 4–0 league win over the hosts.

Current squad
As of February 3, 2023

References

External links
 Official site

 
Football clubs in Costa Rica
Association football clubs established in 1961
1961 establishments in Costa Rica